Kakaoh is a khum (commune) of Moung Ruessei District in Battambang Province in north-western Cambodia.

Villages
Source:

 Tuol Prum Muoy
 Tuol Prum Pir
 Chak Touch
 Chak Thum
 Kakaoh
 Srae Ou
 Ph'ieng
 Rumchek

References

Communes of Battambang province
Moung Ruessei District